Strange New Worlds is a 1978 board game published by Heritage Models under the name of Gametime Games.

Gameplay
Strange New Worlds is a game where players use starships to travel from world to world.

Reception
Norman S. Howe reviewed Strange New Worlds in The Space Gamer No. 24. Howe commented that "It's a fascinating, exciting game with overtones of Star Trek and the best space operas. I have not seen a better game this year."

Reviews
Galileo

References

Board games introduced in 1978
Heritage Models games